Miller is a surname of English, Scottish and Irish origins. The name is of German origins when Miller is an anglicization of Müller (surname).

A–C
Aaron Miller (disambiguation)
Adam Miller (disambiguation)
Addie Dickman Miller (1859–1936), American college professor
Alan Gifford Miller (born 1969), American politician from New York
Alano Miller, American actor
Alexander Kennedy Miller (1906–1993), American eccentric recluse
Alexey Miller (born 1962), Russian energy executive officer
Alice Miller (disambiguation)
Ally Miller (footballer)
Ally Miller (rugby union)
Alden H. Miller (1906–1965), American ornithologist
Amos Miller (c. 1865–1888), lynching victim
Amy Bess Miller (1912–2003), American historian, preservationist, and civic leader
Amy Miller (born 1980), Canadian filmmaker
Andre Miller (born 1976), American basketball player
Andrew Miller (disambiguation)
Andy Miller (writer), British writer and editor
Ann Miller (1923–2004), American singer, dancer, and actress
Anthony Miller (disambiguation)
Arjay Miller (1916–2017), president of Ford Motor Company
Arthur Miller (1915–2005), American playwright and essayist
Augustus S. Miller (1847–1905), Mayor of Providence, Rhode Island
Ben Miller, British Actor and Comedian
Benjamin Miller (born 1983), American figure skater
Benjamin K. Miller (judge), American judge
Bina West Miller (1867–1954), American businesswoman
Biscuit Miller (born 1961), American blues bassist, singer and songwriter
Bobbie Heine Miller (1909–2016), South African tennis player
Bode Miller (born 1977), American alpine skier
Brad Miller (baseball), American Philadelphia Phillies infielder
Brian Miller (disambiguation), several people
Brittney Miller (born 1974), American politician
Buddy Miller (born 1952), American country singer
Burton Miller (1926–1982), American costume designer
Calvin Miller, Scottish footballer
Carey D. Miller (1895–1985), American food scientist
Carlos Miller (disambiguation), several people
Casey Miller (1919–1997), American author
Casey Miller (KC Montero) (born 1978), Filipino-American radio DJ, VJ and host
Charles A. Miller (political scientist) (born 1937), professor emeritus of politics and American studies Lake Forest College
Charles Darley Miller (1868–1951), at the 1908 Summer Olympics
Charles Miller (disambiguation)
Cheryl Miller (activist) (1946–2003), American medical cannabis activist
Cheryl Miller (actress) (born 1943), American actress
Cheryl Miller (born 1964), American basketball player; sister of Reggie Miller
Christa Miller (born 1964), American actress
Christian Miller (American football) (born 1996), American football player
Christopher C. Miller (born 1965) former United States Secretary of Defense
Claudia S. Miller, author and immunologist 
Coco Miller (born 1978), American basketball player; twin sister of Kelly Miller (below)
Cody Miller (born 1992), American swimmer
Cody Miller (Troy Montero) (born 1977), Filipino-American actor
Colby Miller (born 1980), American television personality

D–F
Dan Miller (disambiguation)
Daniel Miller (disambiguation)
Danny Miller (disambiguation)
Darius Miller (born 1990), American basketball player
Darrel R. Miller (1920-2010), American farmer and politician
Darren Miller (disambiguation)
David Miller (disambiguation)
Dayton Miller (1866–1941), American physicist
Dean Miller (born 1965), American country music artist, son of Roger Miller
Dean Miller (athlete) (born 1989), English Paralympic athlete
Dennis Miller (disambiguation)
Denny Miller (1934–2014), American actor
Derrick Miller, US Army Sergeant jailed for murder of Afghan civilian
Diana Miller (1902–1927), American actress
Donald Miller (disambiguation)
Doris Miller (1919–1943), American sailor and war hero
Dorothy Canning Miller (1904–2003), American art curator
Dottie Leonard Miller, American business executive
Drew Miller (disambiguation)
Dustin Miller, or D-Loc, American rapper
E. Spencer Miller (1817–1879), American Dean of the University of Pennsylvania Law School
Edmund King Miller (c. 1820 – 1911), Anglican headmaster and priest in South Australia
Edward Miller (disambiguation)
Edwin E. Miller (died 1950), New York state senator
Elizabeth Miller (disambiguation)
Eric Miller (disambiguation)
Eve Miller (1923–1973), American actress
Evgenii Karlovich Miller (1867–1939), Russian general
Fishbait Miller (1909–1989), Doorkeeper of the United States House of Representatives
Flournoy E. Miller (1887–1971), American actor and composer
Frank Miller (disambiguation)
Frank Stuart Miller (1927–2000), Canadian politician and Premier of Ontario
Frederick Douglas Miller (1874–1961), English photographer

G–J
Gabrielle Miller (born 1973), Canadian actress
Gabrielle Miller (Australian actress) (born 1986)
Gary Miller (disambiguation), several people
Gene Miller (1928–2005), American journalist
Genevieve Cruz Miller, Meteorologist-in-Charge of the Weather Forecast Office of Guam
Geoffrey Miller (disambiguation), several people
George Miller (disambiguation), several people
Gerrit Smith Miller Jr. (1869–1956), American zoologist
Gilbert Miller (1884–1969), American Broadway producer
Glenn Miller (1904–1944), American jazz musician
Gord Miller (sportscaster) (born 1964), Canadian television sportscaster
Gray H. Miller (born 1948), Senior United States District Judge for the Southern District of Texas
Greg Miller (disambiguation), several people named Gregory or Greg Miller
H. B. Miller (politician) (1819–1889), politician in New York and Illinois
Hal Miller (disambiguation), several people
Harold Miller (disambiguation), several people
Harriet Miller (disambiguation), several people 
Harry Miller (disambiguation), several people
Harvey Miller (disambiguation), several people
Haynes Miller (born 1948), American mathematician
Heath Miller (born 1982), American football player
Henry Miller (disambiguation), several people
Herb Miller (born 1997), American football player
Herman Miller (disambiguation) (1919–1999)
Hilary Miller (disambiguation), several people 
Hugh Miller (1802–1856), Scottish geologist
Ian Miller (disambiguation), several people
Inger Miller (born 1972), American track and field athlete
J. C. P. Miller (1906–1981), English mathematician and computing pioneer
J. J. Miller (born 1933), Australian Jockey
 J. R. Miller (James Russell Miller, 1840–1912), Christian author and pastor
J. T. Miller (born 1993), American ice hockey player
Jackson Miller (born 1967), American politician from Virginia
Jacques-Alain Miller (born 1944), French psychoanalyst
James Miller (disambiguation), several people
Jan Miller (disambiguation), several people
Jaroslav Miller (born 1971), Czech historian and university rector
Jarrell Miller (born 1988), American kickboxer and boxer
Jason Miller (disambiguation), several people
Jeremy James Miller (born 1976), American television actor
Jerzy Miller (politician) (born 1952), Polish politician
Jess Miller (1884–1965), American politician from Wisconsin
Jimmy Miller (1942–1994), American record producer
Joaquin Miller (1837–1913), American poet, also known as Cincinnatus Heine Miller
Jodi Leigh Miller (born 1972), American bodybuilder
Jody Miller (1941–2022), American country singer
Joe Miller (disambiguation), several people
Joel Miller, fictional protagonist of The Last of Us video game
John Miller (disambiguation), several people
Johnny Miller (disambiguation), several people
Jonathan Miller (disambiguation), several people
Jonathan Miller (1934–2019), British television presenter, author, and neurologist
Jonny Lee Miller (born 1972), English actor
Jordan Miller (disambiguation), several people
Joseph Miller (disambiguation), several people
José Miller (1925–2006), Cuban Jewish leader
Josh Miller (American football) (born 1970), American NFL football punter
Joshua Miller (disambiguation), several people
Judah Miller (born 1973), American screenwriter
Judith Miller (disambiguation), several people
Julie Miller (born 1956), American country music singer
Julius Sumner Miller (1909–1987), American children's science television presenter
Justin Miller (disambiguation), several people

K–M
Kae Miller (1910–1994), New Zealand conservationist and activist
Kari Miller (born 1977), American Paralympic volleyballist
Karlous Miller (born 1983), American comedian 
Kate Miller-Heidke (born 1981), Australian singer-songwriter
Kathryn Bache Miller (1896–1979), American art collector and philanthropist
Kathryn Miller Haines, American novelist and actor
Kei Miller (born 1978), Jamaican poet
Keith Harvey Miller (born 1925), governor of Alaska 1969–1970
Keith Miller (1919–2004), Australian cricketer
Kelly Miller (disambiguation)
Ken Miller (gridiron football) (born 1941), American college football coach
Kenneth Miller (disambiguation)
Kenneth G. Miller (born 1956), American geologist
Kenneth R. Miller (born 1948), American biologist
Kenny Miller (born 1979), Scottish footballer
Keste Miller, Jamaican politician
Kolton Miller (born 1995), American football player
K'Andre Miller (born 2000), American ice hockey player
Lara Jill Miller (born 1967), American television/voice-over actress and lawyer
Larrissa Miller (born 1992), Australian gymnast
Larry H. Miller (1944–2009), American basketball franchise owner
Larry Miller (disambiguation)
Laurence B. (Larry) Miller, American guitarist
Lawrence G. Miller (1936–2014), American politician from Connecticut
Leah Miller (born 1981), Canadian television personality
Lee Miller (disambiguation)
Leon Parker Miller (1899–1980), American lawyer, politician, and judge
Leszek Miller (born 1946), Polish politician
Lewis Miller (philanthropist) (1829–1899), American inventor
Liam Miller (born 1981), Irish footballer
Lillian Miller (1897–1990), American television personality, also known as Miss Miller
Linda Lael Miller (born 1949), American romance novelist
Liz Miller (artist), American artist
Lois K. Miller (1945–1999), American geneticist and academic
Louise Miller (born 1960), English high jumper
Loye H. Miller (1874–1970), American paleontologist
Luke Miller (born 1966), British clergy, Church of England priest
Luke Miller (politician) (1815–1881), American businessman, physician, and politician
Mac Miller (1992–2018), stage name of American rapper and singer Malcolm James McCormick
Mack Miller (disambiguation)
Madeline Miller (born 1978/1979), American novelist
Mandy Miller (born 1944), English child star
Marcus Miller (born 1959), American jazz musician
Mărgărita Miller-Verghy (1865–1953), Romanian novelist and critic
 Marie-Chantal Miller, now Marie-Chantal, Crown Princess of Greece (born 1968), British-born Crown Princess of Greece
Marisa Miller (born 1978), American fashion model
Mark Miller (actor)  (1924–2022), American stage and television actor
Mark F. Miller (born 1943), American politician from Wisconsin
Markus Miller (born 1982), German footballer
Marsha Miller (born 1969), American beach volleyball player
Marvin Miller (1917–2012), executive director of the Major League Baseball Players Association
Mary Miller (disambiguation)
Matthew Miller (disambiguation)
McKaley Miller (born 1996), American actress
Meagan Miller, American opera soprano
Melvin J. Miller (1919–1974), American farmer and politician
Merton Miller (1923–2000), American economist and Nobel laureate
Mesina Miller (born 1953), American nude model
Michael Miller (disambiguation)
Michelle Miller (born 1965), American television reporter
Midge Miller (1922–2009), American politician from Wisconsin
Mina F. Miller (born 1949), American musician
Mitch Miller (1911–2010), American singer and television personality
Montague Miller (1839–1920), Australian labour organizer
Mrs. Elva Miller (1907–1997), American singer

N–S
Nate Miller (disambiguation), multiple people
Nathaniel Miller (born 1979), Canadian water polo player
Ned Miller (1925–2016), American country music singer-songwriter
Neil Miller (writer) (born 1945), American journalist and writer
Nick Miller (DJ), American DJ known as Illenium 
Nicole Miller (born 1952), American fashion designer, cofounder of eponymous company
Noah Miller (water polo) (born 1980), Canadian water polo player
 Norm Miller (born 1946), American Major League baseball player
 Norton George Miller (1942–2011), American botanist
Ola Babcock Miller (1871–1937), American politician
Olga Miller (1920–2003), Australian historian, artist, author and Aboriginal elder of the Butchulla people
Oliver Miller (born 1970), American basketball player
Olivette Miller (1914–2003), American musician
Oskar von Miller (1855–1934), German engineer
Otis L. Miller (1901–1959), American baseball player and politician
Otis L. Miller Jr. (1933–2010), American educator and politician
Owen Miller (born 1996), American baseball player
Page Miller (born 1940), American public historian
Patrick Miller (basketball) (born 1992), American basketball player in the Israeli Basketball Premier League
Patrick Miller (soldier) (born 1980), American prisoner of war
Paula Miller (born 1959), American politician from Virginia
Percy Miller (disambiguation), multiple people
Perry Miller (1905–1963), American historian
Peter Schuyler Miller (1912–1974), American science fiction writer
Philip Miller (1691–1771), Scottish botanist
Pia Miller (born 1983), Indian Australian actress
Primo Miller (1915–1999), American football player
Quincy Miller (born 1992), American basketball player
Ralph Miller (1919–2001), American college basketball coach
Ralph Miller (1933–2021), American alpine ski racer
Ralph Willett Miller (1762–1799), British Royal Navy Captain
Rand Miller (born 1959), American computer game creator
Reggie Miller (born 1965), American basketball player; brother of Cheryl Miller
Reverend Jen Miller (born 1972), American actress and artist
Rex Miller (1939–2004), American author
Rhett Miller (born 1970), American singer and songwriter
Robert Miller (disambiguation)
Robert C. Miller (1920–1998), American meteorologist and US Air Force officer known for tornado forecasting
Robin Miller (disambiguation)
Robyn Miller (born 1966), American computer game creator
Roger Miller (rock musician), American singer and guitarist
Roger Miller (1936–1992), American singer and composer
Rudy Miller (1900–1994), American college athlete and professional baseball player
Russell Miller (born 1938), British journalist and author
Ruth Miller (actress) (1903–1981), American actress
Ryan Miller (disambiguation)
Sammy Miller (rugby league), rugby league footballer of the 1930s for Salford
Samuel Freeman Miller (1816–1890), American Supreme Court Associate Justice
Sara Miller McCune (born 1941), co-founder and Chair of SAGE Publications
Saul Miller (1917–1993), Canadian politician from Manitoba
Scott Miller (disambiguation), multiple people
Sean Miller (born 1968), American basketball coach
Shareef Miller (born 1997), American football player
Shelby Miller (born 1990), American baseball player
Sienna Miller (born 1981), American-English actress
Stanley L. Miller (1930–2007), American biologist and chemist
Stephanie Miller (born 1961), American comedian and radio host
Stephen Miller (disambiguation)
Stephen Decatur Miller (1787–1838), American politician and Governor of South Carolina
Stephen Miller (Minnesota governor) (1816–1881), American politician and Governor of Minnesota
Steve Miller (disambiguation)
Steven Miller (actor) (born 1982), Scottish actor
Steven Miller (record producer) (born 1956), American record producer and musician
Campbell A. "Stretch" Miller (1910–1972), American sportscaster
Sue Miller (born 1943), American novelist
Susana Miller, Argentinean tango dancer and teacher

T–Z
Terry Miller (linebacker) (born 1946), retired American football linebacker who played in the National Football League (NFL)
Terry Miller (politician) (1942–1989), American politician, Lieutenant Governor of Alaska from 1978 to 1982
Terry Miller (running back) (born 1956), retired American football running back who played in the National Football League (NFL)
The Miller Sisters (disambiguation)
Theodore Miller (1816–1895), New York judge
T. J. Miller (born 1981), American actor and comedian
Tizane Miller (born 2001), English musician
Tommy Miller (born 1979), English footballer
Tony Miller (disambiguation)
Tyson Miller (born 1995), American baseball player
Ventrell Miller (born 1999), American football player
Vernon C. Miller (1896–1933), American murder victim
Vern Miller (1928–2021), American politician and lawyer
Victor S. Miller (born 1947), American mathematician
Von Miller (born 1989), National Football League player
Wade Miller (Canadian football) (born 1973), Canadian football player
Wade Miller (born 1976), American baseball player
Walter M. Miller Jr. (1923–1996), American science fiction author
Walter Miller (footballer) (1885–?), English footballer
Warren Miller (disambiguation)
Warren E. Miller (born 1964), American politician from Maryland
Wentworth Miller (born 1972), American-British actor
Whitey Miller (1915–1991), American baseball player
Willard Miller, American sailor and Medal of Honor recipient
William Miller (disambiguation)
William Hallowes Miller (1801–1880), British mineralogist and crystallographer
William Miller (Peruvian general) or Guillermo Miller (1795–1861), British soldier who participated in South American revolutions
Willie Miller (footballer, born 1910), Scottish footballer (Everton, Burnley)
Willie Miller (footballer, born 1924) (1924–2005), Scottish footballer (Celtic, Scotland)
Willie Miller (footballer, born 1969), Scottish footballer (Hibernian)
Willie Miller (born 1955), Scottish footballer (Aberdeen, Scotland)
Wyatt Miller (born 1995), American football player
Zell Miller (1932–2018), American politician from Georgia

See also
Justice Miller (disambiguation)
Millar
Miller (disambiguation)

Occupational surnames
Miller
Miller